The Bluestars are invitational Gaelic football and Hurling teams that are composed of and represent the best players of Dublin GAA. The Bluestars play invitational challenge matches against Dublin GAA clubs.

Dublin GAA